Leesburg Historic District is a national historic district located at Leesburg, Kosciusko County, Indiana. The district encompasses 21 contributing buildings, and 1 contributing structure in the central business district and surrounding residential section of Leesburg. It developed between about 1865 and 1936, and includes notable examples of Italianate, Late Victorian, and Early Commercial style architecture. Notable buildings include the Public Works Administration funded Town Hall (1936), Masonic / IOOF Building (1890), D.K. Brown Building (1890), Wallace House (c. 1890), and Hart Brown House (1900).

It was listed on the National Register of Historic Places in 1993.

References

Public Works Administration in Indiana
Historic districts on the National Register of Historic Places in Indiana
Italianate architecture in Indiana
Victorian architecture in Indiana
Historic districts in Kosciusko County, Indiana
National Register of Historic Places in Kosciusko County, Indiana